Baseball America has given out an annual, national High School Player of the Year Award every year since 1992. The award has been won by many players who have gone on to have successful major-league baseball careers.

List of winners

See also
Baseball America #High-school baseball awards (additional awards)
American Baseball Coaches Association (ABCA) High School Player of the Year
Gatorade High School Baseball Player of the Year
USA Today High School Baseball Player of the Year
Baseball awards#U.S. high-school baseball
The National Classic

References

Baseball trophies and awards in the United States
Most valuable player awards
High school baseball in the United States
Awards established in 1992